Dorchester is an unincorporated community located within Maurice River Township, in Cumberland County, New Jersey, United States. The area is served as United States Postal Service ZIP code 08316.

As of the 2000 United States Census, the population for ZIP Code Tabulation Area 08316 was 283.

Shipbuilding has always been the principal industry in Dorchester, and the A.J. Meerwald, the state ship of New Jersey, was built here.

Demographics

History
It is said that it was in Dorchester where the Dutch ship Prince Maurice sank, giving the Maurice River and Maurice River Township its name.

References

External links
Census 2000 Fact Sheet for ZIP Code Tabulation Area 08316 from the United States Census Bureau

Maurice River Township, New Jersey
Unincorporated communities in Cumberland County, New Jersey
Unincorporated communities in New Jersey